Central Bedeque is a former municipality that previously held community status in the Canadian province of Prince Edward Island. It was dissolved through its amalgamation with the Community of Bedeque on November 17, 2014 to create the Community of Bedeque and Area. It is located north of Borden-Carleton within Lot 26, Prince County. Its primary industry is agriculture.

History
The name, Central Bedeque, was first adopted in 1925, and was confirmed in 1944. It was established as a village in 1966. Its former names were the Strong's Corner, and the Weatherbie's Corner until the name was changed to Central Bedeque when it was incorporated.

Geography
Central Bedeque is located northwest of Borden-Carleton in the central part of the province on the south shore (fronting the Northumberland Strait), and is on the Dunk River.

Central Bedeque traces its name to neighbouring Bedeque (which it also shares with neighbouring North Bedeque and Lower Bedeque).  The name "Bedeque" may be a corruption of a term used by the Mi'kmaq Nation with several meanings such as "sunny camping place" or "the hot place".

References

Communities in Prince County, Prince Edward Island
Former community municipalities in Prince Edward Island
Populated places disestablished in 2014